Stompdrift Dam is a combined multi-arch and gravity type dam located on the Olifants River near De Rust, Western Cape, South Africa.

It was constructed in 1965 and serves primarily for irrigation purposes. The hazard potential of the dam has been ranked high (3) because of inadequate capacity in the spillway and structural concerns.

See also
List of reservoirs and dams in South Africa
List of rivers of South Africa

References 

Dams in South Africa
Dams completed in 1965